Pusey House is an Anglican religious institution located on St Giles', Oxford, United Kingdom, immediately to the south of Pusey Street. It is firmly rooted in the Anglo-Catholic Prayer Book tradition of the Church of England, and was founded in 1884 in memory of Edward Bouverie Pusey, Regius Professor of Hebrew at Oxford University, and one of the leaders of the Oxford Movement.

The House was established as a 'House of Piety of Learning' with a Library and Chapel, both of which remain open and in use today. One of the original intentions of Pusey House was to house Dr Pusey's collection of books and, since its foundation, the House has come to possess many artefacts relating to Pusey and the Oxford Movement, with the House's Library and Archive holding one of the country's most significant collections of material pertaining to Anglo-Catholicism. The House holds daily services in its chapel, as well as regular lectures and events, and has been described as 'a centre of the Catholic life'.

Pusey House is closely associated with the University of Oxford, especially St Cross College which moved onto the Pusey House site in 1981, but is not itself a permanent private hall or constituent college.

History
Pusey House was opened on 9 October 1884 in part as a memorial to Edward Bouverie Pusey, Regius Professor of Hebrew at Oxford University, a canon of Christ Church Cathedral and for 40 years, a leading figure in the Oxford Movement, a movement of the mid-19th century which sought to bring the Church of England to a deeper understanding of its witness as part of the universal ('Catholic') Church. It was also intended to continue the work of Pusey in restoring the Church of England's Catholic life and witness. It was established with a fund of £50,000 to provide a building for Pusey's library, purchase it and create an endowment so that two or more clergy could take charge of it and promote religious life in the university. The first principal was Charles Gore, who founded the Community of the Resurrection at the House in 1892. The Community moved to Mirfield (where it remains) when Gore resigned as Principal in 1897.

The House flourished in the following years, and came to experiment with forms of quasi-monastic life. Vincent Stuckey Stratton Coles, Principal from 1897 to 1909, later recorded that 'for a moment it seemed as if the Pusey House was trying to become a monastery. Silence was observed at dinner on Fridays. Great regularity of attendance at the chapel offices, and regulations as to the times of retirement and rising, began to be practised'. Coles had been the first Priest Librarian along with F.E. Brightman when Gore was Principal. Edward King, Bishop of Lincoln famously quipped that 'Brightman would dust the books, Gore would read them, and Coles would talk about them'.

During the Principalship of Darwell Stone, a new building was commissioned which was eventually designed by Temple Moore, the leading Anglo-Catholic architect of his age. The House continued its work as the centre of Anglo-Catholicism in Oxford in the new buildings, attracting undergraduates including John Betjeman and Harold Macmillan.

Since 1981, a portion of the Pusey House site has been occupied by St Cross College on a 999-year lease.

Buildings
From 1884 until 1912, Pusey House occupied two townhouses on St Giles' on the site of the current building. Following a 1903 benefaction of £70,000 from a Leeds Solicitor, John Cudworth, and with a growing ministry to the University, Pusey House was able to consider rebuilding. In 1910, the Governors took advantage of the falling in of a lease at a neighbouring townhouse which was subsequently bought and demolished to make way for the new buildings.The Principal at the time, Darwell Stone, requested that the new building should include a chapel 'of good and simple architecture to hold about 200 and a side chapel to hold about thirty' alongside lecture rooms, domestic ranges, a library, and museum. Four architects were approached to submit designs: Harold Brakspear, Walter Tapper, Giles Gilbert Scott, and Temple Moore.

After inspecting the four proposals the Building Committee chose Moore's designs, formally appointing him as architect in October 1911.

Moore designed a large Gothic building around a quadrangle, its centrepiece being the two vaulted chapels separated by a stone pulpitum which he based on those found in 'medieval Franciscan priories'. The Chapel and part of the Library were complete by 1914, and most of the remaining portions of the building were finished in 1918. The south range of the quadrangle remained unexecuted at the time of Moore's death in 1920, and was only finished in 1925 to sympathetic designs by John Coleridge. 

The smaller Chapel of the Blessed Sacrament was reordered between 1935 and 1939 by Sir Ninian Comper. Comper's work in the Chapel included the construction of a gilded baldacchino surmounted by the resurrected Christ and attendant angels, and the stained glass in the east window. In the east window, Comper depicted a Tree of Jesse commemorating Dr Pusey . The window contains figures of Old Testament prophets and Church Fathers surrounding Christ in Majesty and the Virgin and Child. The figure of Pusey can be seen, kneeling at the base of the second light from the right. Comper also designed vestments for Pusey House, and specially designed his 'Strawberry' pattern for the Chapel.

Library 
The library is a theological and historical collection of 75,000 volumes which includes Pusey's library and a large collection of other theological and historical volumes. Pusey's own books, bought after his death, originally formed the heart of Pusey House Library. Since then, by gift and purchase, the library has grown into an important collection that has been recognised by The National Archives as a leading specialist library not only in Oxford but in the United Kingdom. In addition to its primary source material and books on the Anglo-Catholic Movement (Tractarian and Oxford Movements), the library also has good collections of material for the study of Patristics, Church history, liturgy, doctrine, monasticism and Anglican Catholic organisations.

The archive contains extensive material on the Tractarians and the Oxford Movement: the records of a number of Anglo-Catholic societies; communities of monks and nuns; letters and papers of notable Anglicans, as well as the archive of Pusey himself.  
 
The manuscripts include papers of many important figures, organisations and societies connected with the Oxford Movement in the 19th and 20th centuries. The most significant holdings are those of E. B. Pusey, H. P. Liddon, and S. L. Ollard, but there are also papers relating to such notable people as William Ewart Gladstone, John Henry Newman, Frederic Hood, F. L. Cross, and John Keble.

Worship

Worship in the Chapel of the Resurrection is in accordance with the Anglo-Catholic tradition in the Church of England and is open to all, especially to members of the university. Alongside its reputation for dignified and traditional liturgy, Pusey House is also recognised for its musical tradition, most visible at the Solemn Mass on Sundays and solemnities. The choir's extensive repertoire ranges from the earliest church music and Gregorian chant, through the polyphony of Byrd and extending to 19th and 20th century composers such as Vierne and Stanford. Pusey House commissioned a new Mass-setting for its 125th anniversary celebrations from the composer Alexander Campkin.

Services and observances
 Compline each Tuesday evening during full term
 Low Mass daily during full term, with a BCP celebration on Fridays
 Morning Prayer and Evening Prayer, daily during full term
 Solemn High Mass every Sunday and on major festivals during full term with the Ordinary of the Mass sung by the choir

Principals
1884-1893: Charles Gore
1893-1897: Robert Lawrence Ottley
1897-1909: Vincent Stuckey Stratton Coles
1909-1934: Darwell Stone
1934-1951: Archibald Frederic Hood
1951-1970: Francis Hugh Maycock
1970: Barry Marshall (died before installation)
1970-1981: Cheslyn Peter Montague Jones
1982-2002: Philip Ursell
2003-2013: Jonathan Baker
2013-    : George Westhaver

Priest Librarians
The office of Priest Librarian dates from the foundation of the House in 1884- the following is an incomplete list of those who have served in this role:

1884-1897 VSS Coles
1884-? F. E. Brightman*
1895-1908 H.F.B. Mackay
1908-1919 Darwell Stone*
1921-1924 Mark Carpenter-Garnier
1922-1923 Maurice Child
1927-1944 F.L. Cross*
1929-1937 Humphry Beevor
1941-1946 Eric Kemp*
1935-1952 Tom Parker*
195?-1955 Barry Marshall
1952-1957 Cheslyn Jones*
1957-1961 Robert Catling*
1960-1969 Donald Allchin
1961-1965 Rodney Hunter
1968-1971 & 1976-1978 Peter Cobb
1983-1994 Harry Smythe
1994-2011 William Davage
2001-2014 Barry Orford

Those marked with an asterisk acted as Library Custodian.

Notable people associated with Pusey House 

Donald Allchin
Jonathan Baker
Humphrey Beevor
John Betjeman
Frank Edward Brightman
Walter Carey
Mark Carpenter-Garnier
Maurice Child
F.L. Cross
Percy Dearmer
Tom Driberg
Austin Farrer
Charles Gore
Archibald Frederic Hood
Rodney Hunter
John Toshimichi Imai
Cheslyn Jones
Eric Kemp
Margaret Heather Laird
C.S. Lewis
Henry Parry Liddon
Charles Abdy Marcon
Robert MacCarthy
Harold Macmillan
Robert Lawrence Ottley
Dorothy L. Sayers
Darwell Stone
J.R.R. Tolkein
Cuthbert Turner
Philip Waggett
Evelyn Waugh
David Williams
Charles Wood, 2nd Viscount Halifax

Gallery

See also

List of miscellaneous works by Temple Moore

References

Further reading
Lepine, A. (2016). Modern Gothic and the House of God: Revivalism and Monasticism in Two Twentieth-Century Anglican Chapels. Visual Resources, 32(1-2), 1-26.
Orford, Barry A., Davage, William, and Ursell, Philip. Piety and Learning : The Principals of Pusey House 1884-2002 : Essays Presented to The Revd Philip Ursell. Oxford: Pusey House, 2002.
"The Pusey Memorial at Oxford." Times, 26 June 1885, p. 12. The Times Digital Archive, Retrieved 16 July 2019.

External links
 
 
 Historical documentation on the founding of Pusey House
 Library blog

Anglo-Catholic educational establishments
Buildings and structures in Oxford
Christianity in Oxford
Education in Oxford
Educational institutions established in 1884
Organisations associated with the University of Oxford
Religious organisations based in England
St Cross College, Oxford
Temple Moore buildings
1884 establishments in England